{{Automatic taxobox 
| image = Jisin u0.jpg
| image_caption = Jinshaia sinensis
| taxon = Jinshaia
| authority = Kottelat & X. L. Chu, 1988
| type_species = Psilorhynchus sinensis| type_species_authority =  Sauvage & Dabry de Thiersant, 1874
}}Jinshaia is a genus of hillstream loaches endemic to China.

Species
There are currently three recognized species in this genus:
 Jinshaia abbreviata (Günther, 1892)
 Jinshaia niulanjiangensis W. X. Li, W. N. Mao & Zong-Min Lu, 1998 (species inquirenda in this genus)
 Jinshaia sinensis'' (Sauvage & Dabry de Thiersant, 1874)

References

Balitoridae
Fish of China